Atheloderma is a genus of fungi belonging to the family Rickenellaceae.

Species:

Atheloderma mirabile 
Atheloderma orientale

References

Hymenochaetales
Agaricomycetes genera